Street Life is the third studio album released by New Orleans rapper, Fiend. It was released on July 6, 1999, for No Limit Records and was produced by Beats By the Pound. The album debuted and peaked at No. 15 on the Billboard 200, staying on the chart for 12 weeks. and it hit No. 1 on the Top R&B/Hip-Hop Albums charts. The album was supported by two singles, "Talk It Like I Bring It" and "Mr. Whomp Whomp".

Track listing
"Street Life"- 2:08
"The Rock Show"- 2:36
"Talk It How I Bring It"- 2:13
"War 4 Reason"- 4:58
"Get in 2 It"- 2:49 (featuring Mia X)
"Ak'n Bad"- 4:29 (featuring Skull Duggery & Mystikal)
"Heart of a Ghetto Boy"- 5:38
"Trip to London"- 2:13  (featuring Kage, Odell)
"The Truth Is"- 3:20
"Been Thru It All"- 2:44 (featuring Magic)
"Mr. Whomp Whomp"- 2:42
"I Was Placed Here"- 2:33 (featuring Holloway of Ghetto Commission & Odell)
"I'm Losing My Mind"- 2:31
"They Don't Hear Me"- 2:25
"If They Don't Know"- :49
"Walk That Line"- 5:16
"Waiting on God"- 4:49

Credits
Craig B - Producer 
O'Dell - Producer, Additional Vocals
Fiend - Composer, Primary Artist  
Leslie Henderson - Photography  
Holloway -  Featured Artist  
Kage - Featured Artist  
KLC - Producer  
Magic - Featured Artist   
Master P - Executive Producer 
Mia X  Featured Artist
Mystikal -  Featured Artist
Skull Duggery (rapper)  Performer  
Carlos Stephens - Producer

Charts

Weekly charts

Year-end charts

See also
 List of number-one R&B albums of 1999 (U.S.)

References

1999 albums
Fiend (rapper) albums
No Limit Records albums
Priority Records albums